Copies of the World Radio TV Handbook (including the 1991 edition) have identified 1584 kHz as a local frequency, akin to the Class C (former Class IV) radio stations in North America which are limited to 1kW.

The following radio stations broadcast on AM frequency 1584 kHz:

Australia
4CC in Rockhampton, Queensland
5WM in Woomera, South Australia (ABC North/West)
7SH in St Helens, Tasmania (ABC National)
2WA in Wilcannia, New South Wales (ABC Broken Hill)

Italy
 Free Radio AM - Radio Diffusione Europea

Japan
JOQG in Hukaura 
JOBG in Shimabara (both NHK-1)

Korea
HLDK in Danyang 
HLQZ in Geumsan (both KBS-1)

Palau
T8AA in Koror

The Philippines
DWBR-AM in Talavera

United Kingdom

Tay 2 in Perth
Formerly BBC Hereford and Worcester from Woofferton (until 2021)
Formerly London Turkish Radio (1990–2013)

References

Lists of radio stations by frequency